The Caribbean Telecommunications Union (CTU) is an intergovernmental organization established by CARICOM in 1989, to facilitate development of the telecommunications sector in the Caribbean.

Governance

Secretary-Generals

Member States 

 Anguilla
 Antigua and Barbuda
 The Bahamas
 Barbados
 Belize
 The British Virgin Islands
 Cayman Islands
 Cuba
 Dominica
 Grenada
 Guyana
 Jamaica
 Montserrat
 St. Kitts and Nevis
 St. Lucia
 St. Maarten 
 St. Vincent and the Grenadines
 Suriname
 Trinidad and Tobago 
 The Turks and Caicos Islands

Between September and October 2022, 13 of the CTU member states participated in the International Telecommunications Union (ITU) Plenipotentiary Conference (PP-22) in Bucharest, Romania.

Regional Initiatives

Caribbean Internet Governance Forum (CIGF) 
In 2005, the CTU and the CARICOM Secretariat initiated the CIGF as a regional, multi-stakeholder, annual forum. As part of the 18th CIGF in 2022, the CTU hosted the inaugural Small Island Developing States Internet Governance Forum (SIDS IGF) in Trinidad and Tobago.

Other initiatives 

 Caribbean Regional Communications Infrastructure Programme (CARCIP)
 Caribbean Spectrum Planning and Management Project
 Caribbean Centre of Excellence
 Caribbean ICT Roadshow
 ICT for Persons with Disabilities
 Caribbean Network Operators Group (CaribNOG)

References 

International telecommunications
Intergovernmental organizations
International organizations based in the Caribbean
Caribbean Community
1989 establishments in Trinidad and Tobago